Desert Wind is an album by the Israeli singer Ofra Haza, released in 1989. Popular in Israel, Haza was unknown in the rest of the world until the previous year, when the song "Im Nin'Alu" and the album Shaday were released. Desert Wind was therefore more oriented toward the international market.

The main language of the album is English, however Haza also sings in Arabic, Hebrew, and the ancient language of Aramaic. The album includes traditional folk Yemenite songs. The sound is a mainstream form of dance music with elements of synthpop and, on track 8, an influence of house music. The album ends with "Kaddish," a Jewish prayer that, as Haza writes, is meant to hold all the world's sorrows on the wings of an angel. The song has a short English introduction; the main part of the prayer is in Aramaic.

Production
The album was produced by Arif Mardin, Joe Mardin, Haza, Thomas Dolby, and Bezalel Aloni.

Critical reception
Trouser Press wrote: "Making a self-conscious effort to maintain a connection to her musical roots while reaching out for mainstream appeal, Haza locates a fascinating midpoint between the Middle East and the Midwest on 'Ya Ba Ye', 'I Want to Fly' and 'Da’Asa'." New York wrote that "the novelty of combining religious music with drum programs is interesting only the first few times ... Haza is at her best on the slow, dolorous closing cut, 'Kaddish'." Spin thought that the music "teases our Western rock'n'roll longing for strangeness, then satisfies it by giving us soul and personality and cultural context."

Track listing
"Wish Me Luck" (Aloni, Haza) - 4:10 
"Ya Ba Ye" (Aloni, Haza) - 5:06 
"Middle East" (Aloni, Haza, Mardin) - 4:37 
"I Want to Fly" (Aloni, Amram, Haza) - 4:26 
"Slave Dream" (Aloni, Haza) - 4:46 
"Taw Shi" (Aloni, Dolby, Haza) - 3:28 
"Mm'mma (My Brothers Are There)" (Aloni, Haza) - 4:23 
"In Ta" (Aloni, Haza) - 5:50 
"Fatamorgana (Mirage)" (Aloni, Haza) - 4:59 
"Da'asa" (Aloni, Haza) - 2:41 
"Kaddish" (Aloni, Haza) - 4:34

Personnel
 Ofra Haza - lead vocals
 Fonzi Thornton - backing vocals track 3
 Lani Groves - backing vocals track 3
 Lisa Fischer - backing vocals track 3
 Mark Stevens - backing vocals track 3
 Rachele Cappelli - backing vocals track 3
 Kadya (Shoshana) Haza - vocals track 9
 Joe Mardin - keyboards, programming, vocoder, conductor strings, drums, backing vocals
 Omar Faruk Tekbilek - baglama, oud (ut) 
 Gene Orloff - concertmaster
 Iki Levy - drums and percussion programming, cymbal, loops, goblet drum (darbuka solo),
 Yaron Bachar - keyboards 
 Andy Paley - additional guitars
 Paul Pesco -  guitar 
 Adi Dgani - keyboards
 Dario Malki - keyboards 
 Rodrigo Manuel - percussion
 Larry Treadwell - guitar  
 Thomas Dolby - keyboards, drum programming, backing vocals 
 Nyle Stynner - windsynth
 Joshua Fried - keyboards, drums, programming, musical shoe tree
 Dario Malki - keyboards

Production
 Arif Mardin - record producer tracks 1 to 3, 7, 8, musical arranger
 Bezalel Aloni - producer tracks 4, 5, 10, 11, musical arranger
 Joe Mardin - producer tracks 1 to 3, 6, 8, musical arranger
 Ofra Haza - producer tracks 4, 5, 10, 11, musical arranger
 Thomas Dolby - producer tracks 5, 6, musical arranger
 Joshua Fried  - musical arranger, additional production
 Scott Canto - sound engineer
 Chris Trevitt - sound engineer
 Metal Dan Wood - sound engineer
 Dave Lebowitz - sound engineer
 Glenn Zimet - sound engineer
 Joe Mardin - sound engineer
 Rich July  - sound engineer
 Michael O'Reilly - sound engineer
 Rod Hui - sound engineer
 Peter Robins - sound engineer
 Ziv Sidi - sound engineer
 Brian Malouf - sound engineer 
 John Jackson - sound engineer
 Toby Wright - sound engineer
 Ted Jensen - audio mastering
 Recorded at Green Street Recording, NYC, "Z" Sound Studios, NYC and Can Am Studios, Tarzana, CA. Vocals and strings on track 1 recorded at SoundTrack and Clinton Studios, NYC. Mixed at Green Street Studio, NYC. Mastered at Sterling Sound, NYC.

Charts

References

1989 albums
Sire Records albums
Ofra Haza albums
Albums produced by Arif Mardin
Albums produced by Thomas Dolby